Brandon Eric Watson (born September 30, 1981) is an American former professional baseball outfielder. Although he bats left-handed, Watson throws right-handed.

In addition, in 2006, Watson appeared in one game as a member of the Cincinnati Reds.

Early life
The godson of Eric Davis, a former Major League Baseball player, Watson graduated from Westchester High School in 1999. While at Westchester, Watson was the Most Valuable Player for the school's baseball team. He also made the All-State first team and the All-City team.

Professional career
In 2005, Watson played for the New Orleans Zephyrs, batting .355 and being selected as a Pacific League All-Star. In August, he was brought up for 10 days before being sent back to New Orleans, and then brought up again in September, amassing only 40 at bats. In 2006, Watson started in center field and batted lead-off for the Nationals on Opening-Day, but he was optioned to the minors after just nine games. He was batting .305 with the Zephyrs, when he suffered a shoulder separation which sidelined him for six weeks (May 27-July 12). Upon his return, he was claimed off waivers in July by the Cincinnati Reds, playing the rest of the season (except for one game with the Reds—on July 30 where he appeared as a pinch runner and stole a base) with their minor league affiliate, Louisville. At the end of the season, he became a free agent, and was signed to a minor league contract with the Detroit Tigers.

With the Clippers, on Father's Day, June 17, Watson set a new International League record by hitting in 43 consecutive games, breaking a 95-year-old record (held by Jack Lelivelt, a member of the Rochester Hustlers).  His streak ended the following day; one day after that, the Nationals called him up to the Major Leagues as a substitute for Robert Fick who went on bereavement leave, and on June 20, started for the first time since April 2006. Watson played five games, batted .278, and was optioned back to Triple-A to make room for Fick's return. Watson was the only Washington outfielder with options remaining, meaning other teams could not claim him if the Nationals sent him down to Triple-A.

In 2008, he played for the Philadelphia Phillies' Triple-A affiliate, the Lehigh Valley IronPigs.  Watson played for the Reno Aces in 2009, in their inaugural year as the Triple-A affiliate of the Arizona Diamondbacks.

After signing a minor league contract with the Los Angeles Dodgers, Watson was released on March 31, 2010. He last played for the Newark Bears of the independent Canadian-American Association in 2011.

References

External links

1981 births
Living people
African-American baseball players
American expatriate baseball players in Canada
Baseball players from Los Angeles
Brevard County Manatees players
Cincinnati Reds players
Clinton LumberKings players
Columbus Clippers players
Edmonton Trappers players
Gulf Coast Expos players
Gulf Coast Nationals players
Harrisburg Senators players
Washington Nationals players
Lehigh Valley IronPigs players
Louisville Bats players
Major League Baseball center fielders
New Orleans Zephyrs players
Newark Bears players
Reno Aces players
Westchester High School (Los Angeles) alumni
Vermont Expos players
21st-century African-American sportspeople
20th-century African-American people